F. Herbert Fallas (1 November 1861 – ) was an English rugby union footballer who played in the 1880s. He played at representative level for England, and Yorkshire, and at club level for Wakefield Trinity (were a rugby union club at the time, so no Heritage № is allocated), as a three-quarters, i.e. wing or centre. Prior to Tuesday 27 August 1895, Wakefield Trinity was a rugby union club.

Background
Herbert Fallas was born in Wakefield, West Riding of Yorkshire.

Playing career

International honours
Herbert Fallas won a cap for England while at Wakefield Trinity in the 1884 Home Nations Championship against Ireland.

County honours
Herbert Fallas represented Yorkshire while at Wakefield Trinity.

Change of Code

When Wakefield Trinity converted from the rugby union code to the rugby league code on Tuesday 27 August 1895, Herbert Fallas would have likely been in his thirties. Subsequently, he didn't become both a rugby union, and rugby league footballer for Wakefield Trinity.

Genealogical information
Herbert Fallas' brother John H. Fallas was Wakefield Trinity's representative at the formation of the Northern Rugby Football Union on Thursday 29 August 1895 at the George Hotel, Huddersfield.

References

External links
Search for "Fallas" at rugbyleagueproject.org
The Great Schism
Historical Rugby Milestones 1890s

1861 births
England international rugby union players
English rugby union players
Rugby union players from Wakefield
Place of death missing
Rugby union three-quarters
Wakefield Trinity players
Year of death missing
Yorkshire County RFU players